Center Township is a township in Mills County, Iowa, USA.

History
Center Township was organized in 1879.

References

Townships in Mills County, Iowa
Townships in Iowa